Amber Sibley is an American make-up artist. She was nominated for an Academy Award in the category Best Makeup and Hairstyling for the film Shadow of the Vampire.

Selected filmography 
 Shadow of the Vampire (2000; co-nominated with Ann Buchanan)

References

External links 

Living people
Year of birth missing (living people)
Place of birth missing (living people)
American make-up artists